A rover (or sometimes planetary rover) is a planetary surface exploration device designed to move across the solid surface on a planet or other planetary mass celestial bodies.  Some rovers have been designed as land vehicles to transport members of a human spaceflight crew; others have been partially or fully autonomous robots.  Rovers are typically created to land on another planet (other than Earth) via a lander-style spacecraft, tasked to collect information about the terrain, and to take crust samples such as dust, soil, rocks, and even liquids.

Features 
Rovers arrive on spacecraft and are used in conditions very distinct from those on the Earth, which makes some demands on their design.

Reliability 
Rovers have to withstand high levels of acceleration, high and low temperatures, pressure, dust, corrosion, cosmic rays, remaining functional without repair for a needed period of time.

Autonomy 
Rovers which land on celestial bodies far from the Earth, such as the Mars Exploration Rovers, cannot be remotely controlled in real-time since the speed at which radio signals travel is far too slow for real-time or near-real-time communication. For example, sending a signal from Mars to Earth takes between 3 and 21 minutes. These rovers are thus capable of operating autonomously with little assistance from ground control as far as navigation and data acquisition are concerned, although they still require human input for identifying promising targets in the distance to which to drive, and determining how to position itself to maximize solar energy. Giving a rover some rudimentary visual identification capabilities to make simple distinctions can allow engineers to speed up the reconnaissance. During the NASA Sample Return Robot Centennial Challenge, a rover, named Cataglyphis, successfully demonstrated autonomous navigation, decision-making, and sample detection, retrieval, and return capabilities.

Non-wheeled approaches 

Other rover designs that do not use wheeled approaches are possible.  Mechanisms that utilize "walking" on robotic legs, hopping, rolling, etc. are possible.  For example, Stanford University researchers have proposed "Hedgehog", a small cube-shaped rover that can controllably hop—or even spin out of a sandy sinkhole by corkscrewing upward to escape—for surface exploration of low gravity celestial bodies.

History

Lunokhod 0 (No.201)
The Soviet rover was intended to be the first roving remote-controlled robot on the Moon, but crashed during a failed start of the launcher 19 February 1969.

Lunokhod 1

The Lunokhod 1 rover landed on the Moon in November 1970. It was the first roving remote-controlled robot to land on any celestial body. The Soviet Union launched Lunokhod 1 aboard the Luna 17 spacecraft on November 10, 1970, and it entered lunar orbit on November 15. The spacecraft soft-landed in the Sea of Rains region on November 17. The lander had dual ramps from which Lunokhod 1 could descend to the lunar surface, which it did at 06:28 UT. From November 17, 1970, to November 22, 1970, the rover drove 197 m, and during 10 communication sessions returned 14 close up pictures of the Moon and 12 panoramic views. It also analyzed the lunar soil. The last successful communications session with Lunokhod 1 was on September 14, 1971.  Having worked for 11 months,
Lunokhod 1 held the durability record for space rovers for more than 30 years, until a new record was set by the Mars Exploration Rovers.

Apollo Lunar Roving Vehicle

NASA included Lunar Roving Vehicles in three Apollo missions: Apollo 15 (which landed on the Moon July 30, 1971), Apollo 16 (which landed April 21, 1972), and Apollo 17 (which landed December 11, 1972).

Lunokhod 2

The Lunokhod 2 was the second of two unmanned lunar rovers landed on the Moon by the Soviet Union as part of the Lunokhod program.  The rover became operational on the Moon on January 16, 1973. 
It was the second roving remote-controlled robot to land on any celestial body. The Soviet Union launched Lunokhod 2 aboard the Luna 21 spacecraft on January 8, 1973, and the spacecraft soft-landed in the eastern edge of the Mare Serenitatis region on January 15, 1973. Lunokhod 2 descended from the lander's dual ramps to the lunar surface at 01:14 UT on January 16, 1973. Lunokhod 2 operated for about four months, covered  of terrain, including hilly upland areas and rilles, and sent back 86 panoramic images and over 80,000 TV pictures. Based on wheel rotations Lunokhod 2 was thought to have covered  but Russian scientists at the Moscow State University of Geodesy and Cartography (MIIGAiK) have revised that to an estimated distance of about  based on Lunar Reconnaissance Orbiter (LRO) images of the lunar surface.

PrOP-M

The Soviet Mars 2 and Mars 3 landers each had a small 4.5 kg  Mars rover on board, which would have moved across the surface on skis while connected to the lander with a 15-meter umbilical. Two small metal rods were used for autonomous obstacle avoidance, as radio signals from Earth would have taken too long to drive the rovers using remote control. The rover was planned to be placed on the surface after landing by a manipulator arm and to move in the field of view of the television cameras and stop to make measurements every 1.5 meters. The rover tracks in the Martian soil would also have been recorded to determine material properties. Because of the crash landing of Mars 2 and the communication failure (15 seconds post landing) of Mars 3, neither rover was deployed.

Lunokhod 3
The Soviet rover was intended to be the third roving remote-controlled robot on the Moon in 1977. The mission was canceled due to lack of launcher availability and funding, although the rover was built.

Marsokhod

The  Marsokhod was a Soviet  rover (hybrid, with both controls telecommand and automatic) aimed at Mars, part of the Mars 4NM and scheduled to commence after 1973 (according to the plans of 1970). It was to be launched by a N1 rocket, which never flew successfully.

Sojourner

The Mars Pathfinder mission included Sojourner, the first rover to successfully deploy on another planet. NASA, the space agency of the United States, launched Mars Pathfinder on 4 December 1996; it landed on Mars in a region called Chryse Planitia on 4 July 1997. From its landing until the final data transmission on 27 September 1997, Mars Pathfinder returned 16,500 images from the lander and 550 images from Sojourner, as well as data from more than 15 chemical analyses of rocks and soil and extensive data on winds and other weather factors.

Beagle 2 Planetary Undersurface Tool
Beagle 2 was designed to explore Mars with a small "mole" (Planetary Undersurface Tool, or PLUTO), to be deployed by the arm. PLUTO had a compressed spring mechanism designed to enable it to move across the surface at a rate of 20 mm per second and to burrow into the ground, collecting a subsurface sample in a cavity in its tip. Beagle 2 failed while attempting to land on Mars in 2003.

Mars Exploration Rover Spirit 

Spirit is a robotic rover on Mars, active from 2004 to 2010. It was one of two rovers of NASA's ongoing Mars Exploration Rover mission. It landed successfully on Mars at 04:35 Ground UTC on January 4, 2004, three weeks before its twin, Opportunity (MER-B), landed on the other side of the planet. Its name was chosen through a NASA-sponsored student essay competition. The rover became stuck in late 2009, and its last communication with Earth was sent on March 22, 2010.

Mars Exploration Rover Opportunity

Opportunity is a robotic rover on the planet Mars, active from 2004 to early 2019. Launched from Earth on July 7, 2003, it landed on the Martian Meridiani Planum on January 25, 2004, at 05:05 Ground UTC (about 13:15 local time), three weeks after its twin Spirit (MER-A) touched down on the other side of the planet. (related image)

Chang'e 3's Yutu Rover

Chang'e 3 is a Chinese Moon mission that includes a robotic lunar rover Yutu, named after the pet rabbit of Chang'e, the goddess of the Moon in Chinese mythology. Launched in 2013 with the Chang'e 3 mission, it is China's first lunar rover, the first soft landing on the Moon since 1976 and the first rover to operate there since the Soviet Lunokhod 2 ceased operations on 11 May 1973. It was deployed on the Moon on December 14, 2013, and the rover encountered operational difficulties toward the end of the second lunar day after surviving and recovering successfully the first 14-day lunar night (about a month on the Moon),  and was unable to move after the end of the second lunar night, though it continued to gather useful information for some months afterward. In October 2015, Yutu set the record for the longest operational period for a rover on the Moon. On 31 July  2016, Yutu ceased to operate after a total of 31 months, well beyond its original expected lifespan of three months.

Active rover missions

Active Mars rover locations in context

Mars Science Laboratory Rover Curiosity

On 26 November 2011, NASA's Mars Science Laboratory mission was successfully launched for Mars. The mission successfully landed the robotic Curiosity rover on the surface of Mars in August 2012. The rover is currently helping to determine whether Mars could ever have supported life, and search for evidence of past or present life on Mars.

Yutu-2 (Chang'e 4 rover)

Chinese mission launched 7 December 2018, landed and deployed rover 3 January 2019 on the far side of the Moon. It was the first ever rover that operates on the far side of the Moon.

In February 2020, Chinese astronomers reported, for the first time, a high-resolution image of a lunar ejecta sequence, and, as well, direct analysis of its internal architecture. These were based on observations made by the Lunar Penetrating Radar (LPR) on board the Yutu-2 rover while studying the far side of the Moon.

Mars 2020 Perseverance rover  

The Perseverance rover of the Mars 2020 mission is a Mars rover developed by NASA which was launched in 2020 and landed on Mars on February 18, 2021. It is intended to investigate an astrobiologically relevant ancient environment on Mars, investigate its surface geological processes and history, including the assessment of its past habitability and potential for preservation of biosignatures within accessible geological materials.

Tianwen-1 Zhurong

Tianwen-1, a CNSA project, launched on July 23, 2020, and successfully reached Mars orbit on February 10, 2021. The Zhurong rover landed on Mars on May 14, 2021, and was deployed from lander on 22 May 2021. It will conduct scientific missions.

Planned rover missions

Chandrayaan 3

Chandrayaan-3 is a proposed mission by India, consisting of a lunar lander and a rover. It would be a re-attempt to demonstrate soft landing, following the failure of Chandrayaan-2's Vikram lander.

ExoMars Rosalind Franklin

The European Space Agency (ESA) has designed and carried out early prototyping and testing of the Rosalind Franklin rover. , the rover is scheduled for launch in late 2022.

See also 
 List of rovers on extraterrestrial bodies
 Google Lunar X Prize
 Lander (spacecraft)
 LORAX
 Lunar rover
 Mars rover (Crewed)
 Tank on the Moon, 2007 documentary film

References 

 

Off-road vehicles
Spacecraft
 
Soviet inventions
Russian inventions
Space robots